Desmidium is a genus of green algae, specifically of the Desmidiaceae.

Morphology 
Desmidium is one of the  filamentous desmid genera characterized by rather firm intercellular  connections.    Cells connect to adjoining cells at the flat, apical face  of the cells.  The cells can be longer or shorter than wide.  A  median constriction of the cells may appear either as distinct or faint. Desmidium cell  walls are smooth with multiple side-by-side or scattered pores.  Every  semicell contains one stellate chloroplast.  Typically cells are  oval in shape or have a three to five angle.  Angles of the cell  are often off-balance  on each semicell.  This creates a  helical shape of angles throughout the filament.  Cells may have  either a pyrenoid (transparent structure) in each of its lobes or a single  pyrenoid in the middle of the cell.  The nucleus is found in the  conjoined area of semicells (isthmus).  After cell division daughter cells stick together so that the filament in  question increases in length. Moreover, cell filaments are markedly twisted,  to be seen from a gradual shift in position of the cellular lobe facing the  observer. In case of conjugation (almost) all cells in the paired  filaments are sexually activated, resulting in a series of zygospores  coupling the empty cell filaments

 The genus name of Desmidium - derived from the Greek word 'desmos' (= ribbon, chain or bond) - presumably gave rise to the family name of Desmidiaceae.

References

External links

Scientific references

Scientific databases

 
 AlgaTerra database
 Index Nominum Genericorum

Desmidiaceae
Charophyta genera